In enzymology, a cis-dihydroethylcatechol dehydrogenase is an enzyme that catalyzes the chemical reaction

cis-1,2-dihydro-3-ethylcatechol + NAD+  3-ethylcatechol + NADH + H+

Thus, the two substrates of this enzyme are cis-1,2-dihydro-3-ethylcatechol and NAD+, whereas its 3 products are 3-ethylcatechol, NADH, and H+.

This enzyme belongs to the family of oxidoreductases, specifically those acting on the CH-CH group of donor with NAD+ or NADP+ as acceptor.  The systematic name of this enzyme class is cis-1,2-dihydro-3-ethylcatechol:NAD+ oxidoreductase. This enzyme participates in ethylbenzene degradation.

References

 

EC 1.3.1
NADH-dependent enzymes
Enzymes of unknown structure